Liga Deportiva Universitaria de Quito's 1987 season was the club's 57th year of existence, the 34th year in professional football and the 27th in the top level of professional football in Ecuador.

Kits
Sponsor(s): Banco de la Producción

Competitions

Serie A

First stage

Results

Second stage

Group 1

Results

References
RSSSF - 1987 Serie A

External links
Official Site 
LDU Quito (3) - Barcelona SC (1)

1987